Talia M. McCray is an American research scientist.

Personal life
Talia McCray is from Denver, Colorado where she and her siblings grew up. She is the eldest of five children.

Education
McCray is a 1990 graduate of Bennett College in Greensboro, North Carolina, with high honors in a dual degree program in mathematics and electrical engineering from North Carolina Agricultural & Technical State University. She received her master's degree from Northwestern University and her PhD from the University of Michigan in urban technological and environmental planning.

Career
In 2014 McCray was an assistant professor at the University of Texas at Austin, School of Architecture. She served on the Bennett College board of trustees for 9 years and holds numerous awards for her work in the community.  In 2013 McCray was a Fulbright-Scotland visiting professor at Glasgow Urban Lab. 

 she is assistant professor of architecture in the African and African Diaspora Studies department at the University of Texas at Austin.

References

Year of birth missing (living people)
Living people
Taubman College of Architecture and Urban Planning alumni
Bennett College alumni
University of Texas at Austin faculty
People from Denver